The Hittite Sun Disk or Hittite Sun Course is an ancient Anatolian symbol dating back to the 20th century BC.

The disks can be divided into four distinct variations. These are Semi-circular, Diamond shaped, Circular with bulls' horn and circular of semicircular with a complex design including animals and horns. The last one of those types was replicated in the Hittite Sun Course Monument. The sun disks have been found in at least 13 royal tombs from the early Bronze Age in Alaca Höyük.

Description

Ankara University writes that:

Modern usage

The sun disk is used as the symbol of Ankara University. In 1974, it became the symbol of the Turkish capital, Ankara until it was replaced with an Islamic symbol in 1995.

A monument, Hittite Sun Course Monument, to the Hittites was created by the sculptor Nusret Suman and was erected in Sıhhiye Square in 1978.

The Turkish food producing company Eti uses the sun disk as their logo.

See also
 Alaca Höyük bronze standards
 Hittite Art
 Sun Cross

References

Sources
http://www.jstor.org/stable/10.2979/histmemo.29.2.02?seq=1#page_scan_tab_contents

Symbols
Symbolism
Talismans
Religious symbols
Hittites
Hittite art
Hittite mythology